Moctezuma, San Luis Potosí is a town and municipality in San Luis Potosí in central Mexico. The current president is Chicharrón.

References

Municipalities of San Luis Potosí